Archias, son of Anaxidotos was a quasi-mythological Corinthian citizen and founder (oekist) of the colony of Syracuse in Sicily.

Legend
Archias fell in love with the son of Melissus, named Actaeon (distinct from Actaeon, son of Aristaeus) – the most handsome and modest youth of his age in the city – and proceeded to court him. Finding that "no fair means or persuasion" prevailed upon the youth, Archias made plans to kidnap him. Under the guise of inviting himself to Melissus' house in order to take part in a feast, Archias and his accomplices laid hands on the boy and attempted to spirit him away.  The family resisted, and in the ensuing tug of war Actaeon was torn apart.

Melissus demanded justice of the Corinthians, but was ignored by them. In return he climbed to the top of Poseidon's temple, invoked the god's wrath as vengeance for his son's murder and threw himself onto the rocks. A great drought and famine resulted, and the oracle, upon being consulted, announced that the death of Actaeon had to be avenged. Archias went into voluntary exile, and led a group of Corinthians into Sicily where they established the colony of Syracuse. 

After establishing the town and fathering two daughters, Archias was "treacherously" slain by Telephus, whom he had taken advantage of when Telephus was still a boy.

Sources
 Plutarch, Moralia "Five Tragical Histories of Love" II

Ancient Corinthians
Ancient Syracuse
Mythological city founders